Trioism is an album by jazz drummer Paul Motian that was released on the German JMT label. Recorded in 1993, it was first released in 1994 and features performances by Motian with guitarist Bill Frisell and tenor saxophonist Joe Lovano (with tenor saxophonist Dewey Redman added on one track.) The album was rereleased on the Winter & Winter label in 2005.

Reception
The Allmusic review by John Vallier awarded the album 4½ stars, stating: "A first-rate work, Paul Motian's Trioism is one of those rare, successful ensemble performances that manages to both stir and calm the soul".

Track listing
All compositions by Paul Motian
 "It Should've Happened a Long Time Ago" - 8:47 
 "Cosmology" - 6:26 
 "Blue Midnight" - 4:12 
 "Congestion" - 2:41 
 "Monica's Garden" - 3:35 
 "Jack of Clubs" - 5:11 
 "Play" - 4:57 
 "In Remembrance of Things Past" - 7:30 
 "Zabel" - 1:37 
 "Endgame" -3:56
Recorded RPM Recording Studios,New York City in June 1993

Personnel
Paul Motian - drums
Bill Frisell - electric guitar
Joe Lovano - tenor saxophone
Dewey Redman - tenor saxophone (“In Remembrance of Things Past”)

References 

1994 albums
Paul Motian albums
JMT Records albums
Winter & Winter Records albums